"Your Everything" is a song written by Chris Lindsey and Bob Regan and recorded by Australian country music singer Keith Urban. It was released in May 2000 as the second single from Urban's first American self-titled album. The song became his first Top 5 hit on the US Billboard Hot Country Singles and Tracks chart, with a peak at number 4.

Music video
The music video was directed by Trey Fanjoy, and premiered on CMT on May 6, 2000, when CMT named it a "Hot Shot".

Chart positions

Year-end charts

References

2000 singles
Keith Urban songs
Music videos directed by Trey Fanjoy
Songs written by Bob Regan
Songs written by Chris Lindsey
Capitol Records Nashville singles
1999 songs
Country ballads